Pseudopostega latisaccula is a moth of the family Opostegidae. It is probably widespread in the Greater Antilles but currently known only from Dominica (where it is common) and Puerto Rico.

The length of the forewings is 2–2.4 mm. Adults are mostly white. Adults have been collected throughout most of the year with records for January, from to March to June and August.

Etymology
The species name is derived from the Latin latus (broad, wide) and sacculus (little sac) in reference
to the diagnostic, greatly enlarged saccular lobe of the male valva.

External links
A Revision of the New World Plant-Mining Moths of the Family Opostegidae (Lepidoptera: Nepticuloidea)

Opostegidae
Moths described in 2007